These railroads were bought, leased, or in other ways had their track come under ownership or lease by the New York, New Haven and Hartford Railroad. The NYNH&H was formed in 1872 as a merge of the New York and New Haven Railroad and Hartford and New Haven Railroad.

Old Colony Railroad 1893
Boston and Providence Railroad 1888
Stoughton Branch Railroad 1872
Boston, Clinton, Fitchburg and New Bedford Railroad 1879
Boston, Clinton and Fitchburg Railroad 1876
Agricultural Branch Railroad 1869 
Fitchburg and Worcester Railroad 1869 
Framingham and Lowell Railroad 1871 
Mansfield and Framingham Railroad 1870 
New Bedford Railroad 1875
New Bedford and Taunton Railroad 1874
Fairhaven Branch Railroad 1868 
Taunton Branch Railroad 1873
Cape Cod Railroad 1872
Cape Cod Branch Railroad 1868
Cape Cod Central Railroad 1868 
Duxbury and Cohasset Railroad 1878 
Fall River, Warren and Providence Railroad 1892 
Granite Railroad 1870
Hanover Branch of Massachusetts Railroad 1887 
Middleborough and Taunton Railroad 1874 
Nantasket Beach Railroad 1888 
Old Colony and Newport Railroad 1872
Dighton and Somerset Railroad 1864 
Easton Branch Railroad 1866 
Newport and Fall River Railroad 1863 
Old Colony and Fall River Railroad 1864
Fall River Railroad 1854
Middleborough Railroad 1895 
Old Colony Railway 1854
Dorchester and Milton Railroad 1847
Randolph and Bridgewater Railroad 1845 
Plymouth and Middleborough Railroad 1892 
Providence, Warren and Bristol Railroad 1891 
South Shore Railroad 1876

New England Railroad 1898
New York and New England Railroad 1896
Boston, Hartford and Erie Railroad 1873
Norwich and Worcester Railroad 1869
Boston, Norwich and New London Railroad Company 1837
Worcester and Norwich Railroad Company 1837
Midland Railway 1866
Boston and New York Central Railroad 1858
Norfolk County Railroad 1853
Southbridge and Blackstone Railroad 1853 
New York and Boston Railroad 1864
Charles River Branch Railroad 1855 
Woonsocket Union Railroad 1858 
Thompson and Willimantic Railroad 1863 
Connecticut Central Railroad 1880
Springfield and New London Railroad 1876 
Hartford, Providence and Fishkill Railroad 1878
Hartford and Providence Railroad 1849 
Providence and Plainfield Railroad 1849 
Rhode Island Railroad 1849 
Rockville Branch Railroad 1868 
Meriden, Waterbury and Connecticut River Railroad 1892
Meriden and Cromwell Railroad 1889 
Meriden and Waterbury Railroad 1889 
Milford and Woonsocket Railroad 1887
Hopkinton Railroad 1883 
Milford, Franklin and Providence Railroad 1883 
Providence and Springfield Railroad 1890 
Rhode Island and Massachusetts Railroad 1877 
Woonsocket and Pascoag Railroad 1890 
Norwich and Worcester Railroad 1895

Housatonic Railroad 1892
Berkshire Railroad 1843
Danbury and Norwalk Railroad 1886 
Danbury Terminal Railroad 1997 
New Haven and Derby Railroad 1889 
New York, Housatonic and Northern Railroad 1876 
Shepaug, Litchfield and Northern Railroad 1891
Shepaug Railroad 1887 
Shepaug Valley Railroad 1873
Stockbridge and Pittsfield Railroad 1874
West Stockbridge Railroad 1843

Boston and New York Air-Line Railroad 1883
New Haven, Middletown and Willimantic Railroad 1875

Central New England Railway 1927
Newburgh, Dutchess and Connecticut Railroad 1905
Clove Branch Railroad 1896 
Dutchess and Columbia Railway 1877
New York, Boston and Montreal Railway 1874
Harlem Extension Railroad 1873
Lebanon Springs Railroad 1870 
New York, Boston and Northern Railway 1873
Dutchess and Columbia Railroad 1872 
Philadelphia, Reading and New England Railroad 1899
Central New England and Western Railroad 1892
Hartford and Connecticut Western Railroad 1890
Connecticut Western Railroad 1881 
Rhinebeck and Connecticut Railroad 1882 
Dutchess County Railroad 1892 
Poughkeepsie and Eastern Railroad 1907
New York and Massachusetts Railroad 1893
Poughkeepsie, Hartford and Boston Railroad 1887
Poughkeepsie and Eastern Railway 1875

Hartford and Connecticut Valley Railroad 1887
Connecticut Valley Railroad 1880

New York and New Haven Railroad 1872
New Haven and Northampton Railroad 1849
Hampshire and Hampden Railroad 1862 
Holyoke and Westfield Railroad 1870 
Shore Line Railway 1870
New Haven, New London and Stonington Railroad 1868
New Haven and New London Railroad 1857 
New London and Stonington Railroad 1857 
New York and New London Railroad 1857

Harlem River and Port Chester Railroad 1872

Hartford and New Haven Railroad 1872
Hartford and Springfield Railroad 1847
Middletown Railroad 1850 
New Britain and Middletown Railroad 1868

Meriden, Waterbury and Connecticut River Railway 1898

Naugatuck Railroad 1887
Watertown and Waterbury Railroad 1870

Stamford and New Canaan Railroad 1884
New Canaan Railroad 1883

New Haven and Northampton Railway 1887

New York, Providence and Boston Railroad 1893
Pawtuxet Valley Railroad 1883 
Pontiac Branch Railroad 1880
Providence and Worcester Railroad 1888 
Warwick Railroad 1879 
Westerly Granite Railroad 1881

Newport and Wickford Railroad and Steamboat Company 1909

South Manchester Railroad 1933

References

Railroad History Database

 
New York, New Haven and Hartford Railroad precursors
New Haven